The Folland Fo.108, also known as the Folland 43/37 and by the nickname Folland Frightful (or Frightener), was a large monoplane engine testbed aircraft of the 1940s.

Design and development
The Fo.108 was Folland's response to Air Ministry Specification 43/37 for an engine testbed. It was Folland's first design to be accepted by the Air Ministry for production.
The Fo.108 was a large low-wing cantilever monoplane with a conventional cantilever tailplane and a fixed tailwheel landing gear. It had a glazed cockpit for the pilot, and a cabin for two observers behind and below the pilot, fitted out so that they could make detailed measurements of engine performance during flight.

To enable the aircraft to be delivered from the Hamble factory and later ferried to new assignments, they were normally fitted with a Bristol Hercules radial engine. In service, the Fo.108 was fitted with a number of other engines including the inline Napier Sabre (four), Bristol Centaurus radial, and Rolls-Royce Griffon V-engine.

Entering service in 1940, the type was operated by the Bristol Aeroplane Company, Napier and Rolls-Royce, Five of the twelve production aircraft were lost in crashes, the type earning the nickname "Frightener" as a result. The last examples of the Fo.108 were withdrawn from service in 1946, by de Havilland's engine division.

Specifications (Centaurus engine)

See also

References

Notes

Bibliography

 
 Halley, J. J. Royal Air Force Aircraft P1000-R9999. Tonbridge, Kent, UK: Air-Britain (Historians) Ltd., 1996. .
 

Fo.108
1940s British special-purpose aircraft
Single-engined tractor aircraft
Low-wing aircraft
Aircraft first flown in 1940